Víctor Danilo Cantillo Jiménez (born 15 October 1993) is a Colombian footballer who plays as a defensive midfielder for Brazilian club Corinthians.

Club career
Cantillo was born in Río Frío, Zona Bananera, Magdalena, and joined Atlético Nacional's youth setup in 2009, after representing CD Molino Viejo and CSyD Belén San Bernardo. He made his first team debut on 24 April 2013, starting in a 2–0 Copa Colombia away win against Rionegro Águilas.

Cantillo made his Categoría Primera A debut on 26 July 2013, playing the full 90 minutes in a 3–2 win at Atlético Huila. Rarely used during the season, he subsequently served loans at Categoría Primera B sides Atlético FC and Leones; with the latter side he scored his first senior goal, netting the equalizer in a 2–2 away draw against América de Cali on 26 September 2014.

On 7 January 2017, Cantillo joined Deportivo Pasto in the top tier, with a buyout clause. On 4 July, after impressing with the side, he signed for Junior from Pasto for a rumoured US$ 1.2 million fee, as the latter side exercised his buyout clause.

An immediate starter, Cantillo became a key unit for the side, winning the national cup and reaching the semifinals of the Copa Sudamericana; he also attracted interest from Udinese after the season ended.

On 9 January 2020, Cantillo joined Corinthians until 2023. He will be loaned until June 2021, when an obligation to buy clause will be activated.

International career
On 16 March 2018, Cantillo was called up by national team manager José Pekerman for friendlies against France and Australia.

He made his debut on 16 November 2021 in a World Cup qualifier against Paraguay.

Career statistics

Honours

Club
Atlético Nacional
Categoría Primera A: 2013–I, 2013–II
Copa Colombia: 2013

Junior
Categoría Primera A: 2018–II
Copa Colombia: 2017

References

External links
 

1993 births
Living people
Sportspeople from Magdalena Department
Colombian footballers
Colombia international footballers
Association football midfielders
Categoría Primera A players
Categoría Primera B players
Campeonato Brasileiro Série A players
Atlético Nacional footballers
Atlético F.C. footballers
Leones F.C. footballers
Deportivo Pasto footballers
Atlético Junior footballers
Sport Club Corinthians Paulista players
Expatriate footballers in Brazil